The Last Stone: A Masterpiece of Criminal Interrogation is a 2019 book by Mark Bowden. It tells the story of the reopening of the case of the murders of Katherine and Sheila Lyon, two sisters who disappeared from a Maryland shopping mall in 1975. Their killer was identified in 2013.  Bowden had covered the disappearance for the Baltimore News-American.

References

2019 non-fiction books
Non-fiction books about murders in the United States
Atlantic Monthly Press books
1975 in Maryland
Wheaton, Maryland